Acrinathrin (Rufast and other trade names) is a pyrethroid insecticide and acaricide derived from hexafluoro-2-propanol. In beekeeping, it is used to control the mite Varroa jacobsoni, though resistance is developing.

References

(cyano-(3-phenoxyphenyl)methyl) 2,2,3-trimethylcyclopropane-1-carboxylates
Acaricides
Trifluoromethyl compounds